Oye Ninne is an 2017 Indian Telugu-language romantic drama film directed by debutante Satyam Challakoti and starring newcomers Margani Bharat and Srushti Dange.

Cast 
Margani Bharat as Vishnu
Srushti Dange as Veda ("Ammulu")
Nagineedu as Sekharam, Vishnu's father
Tulasi as Vishnu's mother
Raghu Babu as Veda's father
Pragathi as Veda's mother
Tanikella Bharani
Satya as Vishnu's friend
Thagubothu Ramesh as a drunkard
Dhanraj as Arvind Swamy

Production 
Politician Margani Bharat landed the lead role after meeting Vamsi Krishna Srinivas at a beauty pageant, in which Bharat was one of the judges. Bharat shed eighteen kilograms to portray his role in the film. Tamil actress Srushti Dange made her lead Telugu debut with this film. The film was scheduled to release in October. The film's title Oye Ninne refers to the way in which the hero calls the heroine.

Soundtrack 

The songs were composed by Shekar Chandra.

Release 
The Times of India gave the film a rating of two-and-a-half out of five stars and wrote that "Watch the movie if you’re in for a feel-good film that explores relationships on a relatable level and has beautifully rustic visuals". Telangana Today stated that "The film is narrated from the hero’s point of view and every time it takes a leap, the narration keeps the audience gripped". New Indian Express gave the film a rating of two out of five stars and wrote that "Oye Ninne is the recycled version of many old films that portrayed the bava-maradhalu romance for decades now". In addition to this, the movie faced criticism for normalizing, and even validating, rape and child abuse.

References

External links

 Indian romantic drama films
2017 romantic drama films
2010s Telugu-language films